Canonchet (YTB-823) is a United States Navy .

Construction

The contract for Canonchet was awarded 9 August 1971. She was laid down on 7 February 1973 at Marinette, Wisconsin, by Marinette Marine and launched 10 July 1973.

Nomenclature
Canonchet is named for Canonchet (d. 1676) a sachem of the Narragansett Tribe in Rhode Island.

Operational history

Canonchet was delivered to the navy on 23 September 1973. The tug served at Naval Station San Diego, California into 1993.  Sometime after 1993, she was transferred to Naval Region Northwest where she remains in active service.

References

External links
 

 

Natick-class large harbor tugs
Ships built by Marinette Marine
1973 ships